The Wedding is a 2004 Polish dark comedy film directed by Wojciech Smarzowski.

Plot
The movie opens with the wedding of Janusz and Kasia. The father of the bride, Wieslaw Wojnar, gives Janusz a brand-new-looking Audi.

However, during the traditional, extravagant wedding feast, it is revealed that Wojnar bought Janusz the car as a bribe to marry Kasia, as she is pregnant. Wojnar has to pay several people off so that the wedding celebration can proceed smoothly. This includes securing a plot of land from his father-in-law, who is spending a lot of time in the men's room.

One of Kasia's old lovers is hired to videotape the wedding ceremony, but he's not interested in getting money out of Wojnar, as the others are. Eventually, Wojnar's situation gets worse and worse, as he has to bribe police officers and a notary public over the course of the long, drunken evening.

Cast
Marian Dziędziel as Wojnar, Kasia's father
Iwona Bielska as Eluśka, Kasia's mother
Tamara Arciuch as Kasia
Bartłomiej Topa as Janusz, Kasia's husband
Maciej Stuhr as Cameraman Mateusz
Wojciech Skibiński as Wincenty Mróz, Eluśka's dad and Kasia's grandfather 
Paweł Wilczak as brother to the priest and a gangster 
Andrzej Beja-Zaborski as Adam, the priest 
Lech Dyblik as uncle Edek Wąs
Jerzy Rogalski as uncle Mundek
Agnieszka Matysiak as aunt Hela
Tomasz Sapryk as sergent Styś
Arkadiusz Jakubik as notary Jan Janocha
Pawel Gędłek as Ciapara
Andrzej Mastalerz as policeman Trybus
Robert Wabich as Godfather

Awards
The director won the Eagle at the Polish Film Awards, the East of West Award - Special Mention at the Karlovy Vary International Film Festival and the Youth Jury Award - Special Mention at Locarno International Film Festival, while as writer he won the Best Script award at the Warsaw International Film Festival. Marian Dziedziel (Wojnar) won the Audience Award and the Eagle at the Polish Film Awards.

External links

The Wedding at Film Polski (link in Polish)
The Wedding  at  Stopklatka (link in Polish)
Knee-Slappers: Poland’s Most Beloved Comedies

Polish black comedy films
Films about weddings
2004 black comedy films
2004 comedy films
2000s Polish-language films